William Gilmour may refer to:

 William Gilmour (musician) (fl. 2010s), British musician and artist
 William Gilmour (writer) (fl. 1980s), writer of lost race fantasy short stories and novels
 William Weir Gilmour (1905–1998), Scottish politician

See also
 William Gilmer (1863–1955), U.S. Navy Captain and Naval Governor of Guam
 Bill Gilmour (disambiguation)
 Billy Gilmour (disambiguation)